Tricky Business is an Australian television drama series first broadcast on the Nine Network on 14 May 2012. Filmed in and around Wollongong and Sydney, the program is produced by Screentime with the assistance of Screen Australia. The Nine Network ordered 13 episodes. The series premiered in New Zealand on 4 September 2012 on TV3.

Synopsis
This drama series focuses on a family that runs a debt collection business. Jim and Claire retired debt collectors leave their business in the hands of their eldest daughter Kate, who also runs the business with her partner Rick, her younger sister Lily and family friend Chad. Kate receives an out of the blue proposal from Rick, leaving her to say no, and soon be caught up in a new romance with rival debt collector Matt.

Cast
Season 1 regular cast list from the pilot episode. 

 Lincoln Lewis did not appear after episode 8, however still remains credited on the show.

Recurring cast

Ratings
The first episode of Tricky Business was due to air at 9:30pm on 14 May 2012, however, The Voice Australia ran over its time slot by 12 minutes. Michael Bodey from The Australian reported Tricky Business was tempered by The Voice's lead-in. It lost almost one million viewers in the first five minutes and averaged between 700–900,000 for the last half-hour of its broadcast. Overall, the episode pulled in an average of 1.16 million viewers.

Home media
On 26 July 2012, Ezy DVD Australia released information of Tricky Business. The DVD will be released on 16 August 2012, in a 3 disc set, with special features including;
Shane Bourne : Introduces the Family
Behind The Scenes

No international release has been confirmed at this stage.

See also
 List of Australian television series

References

External links

Nine Network original programming
2010s Australian drama television series
2012 Australian television series debuts
2012 Australian television series endings
Television shows set in New South Wales
2010s Australian crime television series
English-language television shows
Television series by Screentime